Connacht Senior Cup is an association football cup competition organised by the Connacht Football Association. This cup competition should not be confused with the more regularly played Connacht Junior Cup which has effectively been the top level competition for non-League of Ireland clubs when the Senior Cup has been inactive.

History

Connacht Senior League
Between 1981 and 1982 and 1999–2000, when the Connacht Senior League, was active the Connacht Senior Cup featured the members of the CSL and the champions of four junior leagues based in the province – the Galway & District League, the Sligo-Leitrim League, the Mayo Association Football League and the Roscommon & District League. Junior sides did well and featured in the first ten finals, winning four of them. In later seasons there were two more junior winners but all-Connacht Senior League finals became more common. The competition ended when the Senior league ended in 2000. During this era teams from the CSL also played in a separate league cup competition known as the Connacht Senior League Challenge Cup.

Revival
In 2007 a second Connacht Senior Cup was launched. This featured the top two teams from the Galway & District League, the Sligo-Leitrim League, the Mayo Association Football League and the Roscommon & District League plus the Connacht teams that played in the League of Ireland.

List of finals

Notes

References

Defunct association football cup competitions in the Republic of Ireland
Association football cup competitions in Connacht
Connacht Senior League (association football)
1981 establishments in Ireland